John Hawksford (5 October 1806—3 September 1887) was a successful and wealthy solicitor and attorney, a prominent member of the Roman Catholic laity of Wolverhampton and served as Mayor of Wolverhampton from 1863/64, becoming the first Roman Catholic to do so.

The Church
Hawksford had converted to Catholicism and by the late 1840s he had become a prominent member of the Roman Catholic lay community in Wolverhampton. At a cost of £2,000 he purchased land from the agent to the Duke of Cleveland for the building of a new Roman Catholic church for the town. He battled with the Bishop of Birmingham, William Ullathorne over funds for the building works and letters show that this continued through to the laying of the foundation stone for what was to become the church of St Mary and St John.

Politics
Hawksford served as Mayor of Wolverhampton 1863/64.

Family
Hawksford was born 5 October 1806 in Aston, Warwickshire, the son of Samuel Hawksford and Elizabeth née Cope. He arrived in Wolverhampton in 1821 and converted to Catholicism aged 26, probably at the time of his marriage. He had six children but unfortunately his wife died in 1849 and Hawksford remarried in 1853. He had no further children, and died on 3 September 1887.

References

1806 births
1887 deaths
Mayors of Wolverhampton
People from Wolverhampton
English Roman Catholics
English solicitors
People of the Victorian era